Lecheng Town is located in the northwest of Gaoyao County in Guangdong Province at the intersection of Gaoyao County, Deqing County and Guangning County.  It covers an area of 94 square kilometers, with 14 villages under its jurisdiction and with a population of 28,000.

Economic development

Agriculture
Lecheng Town is rich in land resources. Agriculture is the foundation of its economic development, with cinnamon and fingered citron  as the main commercial crops. Currently,  over 50,000 mu of land is devoted to cultivating cinnamon.  Cinnamon and finger citron have become the new growth point of the town's economic development, increasing income for farmers. The town has likewise promoted forestry.

Industry
Lecheng Town takes advantage of its local resource and mainly focuses on resource exploitation and utilization. The "Double Introduction" project (introduction of money and technology) has enjoyed great success. It has formed a batch of township enterprises and private enterprises. A distillery, a soft drink plant, a resin factory, a cinnamon factory and a wood factory have been built up in the town. They contribute a lot to the development of the town's economy.

Social Development
Lecheng Town tries to strengthen the construction of spiritual civilization to create a good social environment. Since reform and opening up, the town pays more attention to improve social morality and cultural quality. During these  few years, it has gained great success in the development in culture, education and health protection. The security administration of the town has been improved greatly. The local police are trying to crack down pornography, gambling and drug abuse to form a better social environment.

Tourism

Golden Clock Mount is also known as Long Gong Temple. It is located in Lecheng Town, Lingcun village. The temple dated back to the late Qing Dynasty and the early Han Dynasty. In March, 2007, Guangdong Star Group Tourism Development Co. Ltd.invested a lot money to expand the temple. It was built in Chinese traditional style with materials like brick, wood and rock  The new temple covers an area of about 3,000 square meters. It attracts tourists to come for sightseeing, blessing, worshiping the Long Gong etc.

Subordinate village
Heshe Village

Xiyuan Village

Luoban Village

Lingcun Village

Bufu Village

Wuun Village

Jinji Village

Luodai Village

Dongyuan Village

Sike Village

Luoyuan Village

Yincun Village

Xianrenkeng Village

Shebo Village

Demographic data

(Source: the fifth census data)

Total population: 23497

Male population: 11976

Female population: 11521

Household number: 6038

0 to 14 years old (total): 7959

0 to 14 years old (male): 4127

0 to 14 years old (female): 3832

15 to 64 years old ( total): 13414

15 to 64 years old (male): 6885

15 to 64 years old (female): 6529

Above 65 years old (total): 2124

Above 65 years old (male): 964

Above 65 years old (female): 1160

References

External links
 http:LINK TEXT
 http:LINK TEXT
 http:LINK TEXT

Towns in Guangdong
Gaoyao